Beheshtabad may refer to:
 Beheshtabad, Chaharmahal and Bakhtiari
 Beheshtabad, Fars
 Beheshtabad, Gilan
 Beheshtabad, Kerman
 Beheshtabad, Kohgiluyeh and Boyer-Ahmad
 Beheshtabad, Semnan
 Beheshtabad, Bampur, Sistan and Baluchestan Province
 Beheshtabad-e Sharif, Bampur County, Sistan and Baluchestan Province
 Beheshtabad, Dalgan, Sistan and Baluchestan Province
 Beheshtabad, Khash, Sistan and Baluchestan Province
 Beheshtabad, former name of Eslamiyeh, a city in South Khorasan Province
 Beheshtabad, Boshruyeh, South Khorasan Province
 Beheshtabad, Tabas, South Khorasan Province
 Beheshtabad, Yazd